Oumaro Coulibaly is a Malian professional footballer, who plays as a defender for Knattspyrnufélag Fjarðabyggðar in Iceland.

References

External links
Profile at goal.com

1993 births
Living people
Sportspeople from Bamako
Malian footballers
F.C. Lumezzane V.G.Z. A.S.D. players
Association football defenders
21st-century Malian people